The 1986–87 Women's IHF Cup was the sixth edition of IHF's second-tier women's handball competition.

1985 Cup Winners' Cup champion Budućnost Titograd defeated Štart Bratislava in the final, overcoming an away loss by a 5-goal margin, to become the second Yugoslav team to win the competition. They previously defeated defending champion SC Leipzig and 1983 champion Avtomobilist Baku on away goals.

Results

References

Women's EHF Cup
EHF Cup Women
EHF Cup Women